The little swift (Apus affinis), is a small species of swift found in Africa and southwestern Asia, and are vagrants and local breeders in southern Europe. They are found both in urban areas and at rocky cliffs where they build nests in a way typical of all members of the order Apodiformes. The genus name Apus is Latin for a swift, thought by the ancients to be a type of swallow without feet (from Ancient Greek α, a, "without", and πούς, pous, "foot"). The Latin specific affinis means similar to or related to, but in this case the species that the little swift supposedly resembles is not clear from the description. A population formerly considered to be an eastern subspecies of little swift is now separated as a distinct species, the house swift (Apus nipalensis).

Description
Little swifts are readily identified by their small size. Their wingspan is only 33 cm compared to 42 cm in the case of common swift. Their plumage is black except for a white throat and rump, the white rump patch extending onto the flanks. They have a short square tail, with all rectrices round-tipped. The flight is fluttering like that of a house martin, and the call is a high twittering. Like other swifts they are very short-legged. The legs are used for clinging to vertical surfaces only.

Habits and foraging
Little swifts spend most of their lives in the air, living on the insects they catch in their beaks. They drink on the wing, but roost on vertical cliffs or walls. They never settle voluntarily on the ground.

Movements
Unlike the more northerly common swift, many birds are resident, but some populations are migratory, and these winter further south than their breeding areas. They wander widely on migration, and are seen as rare vagrants in much of Europe and Asia.

Breeding
Little swifts breed around habitation and cliffs from southern Spain, Africa northeastwards through southern Pakistan and India and Sri Lanka. They build their nests in holes in buildings or sometimes on cliffs, laying 1–4 eggs. A little swift will return to the same site year after year, rebuilding its nest when necessary. A species of bedbug Cimex hemipterus has been recorded from its nest in India.

Gallery

References

External links

 Little swift  - Species text in The Atlas of Southern African Birds.

little swift
Birds of Africa
Birds of South Asia
Birds of Western Asia
little swift
little swift